The Free were a German eurodance group from the 1990s. They were produced by Felix J. Gauder and Olaf Roberto Bossi.

Members
1994–1995: Iris Trevisan
1995–1996: Ayla J.
1994–1999: Charles Simmons

Discography

Studio albums
1996: Crazy Worlds

Singles

References

German house music groups
German Eurodance groups
English-language singers from Germany